Beate Meinl-Reisinger (born 25 April 1978) is an Austrian politician serving as leader of NEOS – The New Austria and Liberal Forum since June 2018. She is also the leader of the party's parliamentary group in the National Council since 2018. Previously, she was a member of the National Council and from 2015 to 2018, and a member of the Gemeinderat and Landtag of Vienna, where she also led the NEOS group. She returned to the National Council after the resignation of Matthias Strolz in 2018.

Education and personal life
Meinl-Reisinger was born Beate Reisinger on 25 April 1978. She attended the Wasagasse grammar school, then studied law at the University of Vienna and completed her master's degree in European Studies at the Danube University Krems. She then completed a trainee program for EU academics at the Austrian Economic Chamber. In this context, she worked for the European Commission and as an assistant to Othmar Karas in the European Parliament.

After the trainee program, she worked as a deputy managing director at "Women in the Economy", a department of the Economic Chamber. She held further positions at the Federal Ministry of Economics and Labor and the Federal Ministry of Economics, Family and Youth. Subsequently, she worked as a consultant for women's, family, and integration policy in the cabinet of State Secretary Christine Marek. In 2009, she became a political advisor for the Vienna branch of the Austrian People's Party (ÖVP).

Meinl-Reisinger is married and has three children.

Political career
From 2010 to 2012, Meinl-Reisinger was a member of the Vienna branch of the ÖVP women's association.

After the birth of her second daughter in 2012, Meinl-Reisinger became involved with the new party NEOS. She was elected to third place on the party's federal list in the 2013 federal election, and was elected to the National Council. After NEOS merged with the Liberal Forum in 2014, she was elected as one of two federal deputy leaders of the party; she also became chairwoman of its Vienna branch. In the National Council, Meinl-Resinger served as chair of the culture committee and was a member of the judiciary committee, the consumer protection committee, and the family committee.

In February 2015, Meinl-Reisinger was selected as the top candidate for the 2015 Viennese state election. On 24 September, she announced her resignation from the National Council to commit time to Viennese politics; she did so on 9 October, two days before the election. She led the party to significant success, winning 6.16% and five seats. She subsequently became chairwoman of the NEOS parliamentary group in the Viennese parliament.

In the 2017 federal election, Meinl-Reisinger was again third on the federal list. She did not take her seat after the election, choosing instead to remain active in Viennese politics.

Federal NEOS leader Matthias Strolz announced his resignation on 7 May 2018. At a party congress on 23 June 2018, Beate Meinl-Reisinger was elected at his successor with 94.8% of the delegate votes. Upon his resignation from the National Council on 18 October, she took his seat, and replaced him as NEOS group leader. Ahead of this, she resigned from her positions in Vienna, and she was replaced as chairperson and group leader by Christoph Wiederkehr.

At a party conference in Vienna on 6 July 2019, Meinl-Reisinger was elected as the top candidate for the 2019 federal election with 96.1% of votes. NEOS won 8.10% of votes in the election, and won 15 seats, an increase of five from its 2013 result.

References

1978 births
Living people
People from Hartberg District
University of Vienna alumni
21st-century Austrian women politicians
21st-century Austrian politicians
Members of the National Council (Austria)
NEOS – The New Austria politicians